Elvy Lissiak (19 July 1929 – 25 February 1996) was an Italian stage and film actress.

Life and career 
Born in Trieste as Elvira Lissiak, she made her film debut with the role of Luciana in Luciano Emmer's Domenica d'agosto, gaining critical appreciation for her performance.  Lissiak later appeared on stage in a rivista with Ugo Tognazzi and in several films alongside Vittorio Gassman, at the time her partner in life. Following the breakup of her relationship with Gassman, she decided to focus her activities on stage, where she knew her then husband, the actor Franco Castellani. She retired from acting in the early 1960s.

Filmography

References

External links 

Actors from Trieste
Italian stage actresses
Italian film actresses
1929 births
1996 deaths
20th-century Italian actresses